Dicyphus constrictus is a Palearctic species of  true bug.

References
 

Dicyphini
Hemiptera of Europe
Insects described in 1852